Kanae Hayashi (born 27 February 1994) is a Japanese professional footballer who plays as a defender for WE League club JEF United Chiba Ladies.

Club career 
Hayashi made her WE League debut on 20 September 2021.

References 

WE League players
Living people
1994 births
Japanese women's footballers
Women's association football defenders
Association football people from Hyōgo Prefecture
JEF United Chiba Ladies players